Cottbusser Platz is a Berlin U-Bahn station located in the borough Marzahn-Hellersdorf on the  line.

The underground station is located south of the Hellersdorfer Straße, which runs parallel to U5 line, at the level of the same place. In contrast to the other stations of the route, the station is not in the incision, but slightly excessive. A pedestrian tunnel gives access to Hellersdorfer Straße north as well as to Carola-Neher-Straße and the Auerbacher Ring south of the station.

History

The station opened in July 1989, just a few months before the fall of the Berlin Wall.

The eastern extension of (what is now) line U5 was one of the last major construction projects of the former German Democratic Republic.

External links 
 U-Bahnhof Cottbusser Platz page on info-marzahn-hellersdorf.de

References

U5 (Berlin U-Bahn) stations
Buildings and structures in Marzahn-Hellersdorf
Railway stations in Germany opened in 1989
1989 establishments in East Germany